William Harry Edward Bentinck (2 February 178429 September 1868) was an Anglican clergyman, who served as Archdeacon of Westminster.

Bentinck was the oldest son of Lord Edward Bentinck (son of the 2nd Duke of Portland and younger brother of the 3rd Duke of Portland, the Prime Minister) and his wife Elizabeth Cumberland, daughter of the dramatist Richard Cumberland.

He was educated at Westminster School and Christ Church, Oxford, matriculating in 1802 aged 18, graduating B.A. 1805, M.A. 1808. He was ordained deacon on 4 May 1807, and priest on 7 February 1808.

Soon after his ordination, Bentinck was appointed Rector of Sigglesthorne, East Riding of Yorkshire, after King George III accepted the recommendation of the Prime Minister (Bentinck's uncle the Duke of Portland) on 27 February 1808. He was appointed domestic chaplain to Edward Venables-Vernon, Archbishop of York in January 1810. He was a canon of Westminster Abbey 1809–1864, becoming rural dean in 1842 and Archdeacon of Westminster. He resigned in October 1864.

On 19 July 1814, Bentinck married Frances Constable, daughter of Thomas Constable (a priest).

Bentinck paid for the construction of Holy Trinity Church, Bessborough Gardens, opened in 1852. (After suffering damage in World War II, the church was demolished in 1954.)

Notes

References

1784 births
1868 deaths
People educated at Westminster School, London
Alumni of Christ Church, Oxford
Archdeacons of Westminster
19th-century English Anglican priests
William